Pahar Ganj  is a neighborhood in the Karachi Central district of Karachi, Pakistan. Pahar (mountains) are small Khasa Hills that form a natural border between North Nazimabad and Orangi. In 2007, City District Government of Karachi built a road, Shahrah-e-Noorjahan, through the Khasa Hills to connect North Nazimabad and Orangi.

There are several ethnic groups in Pahar Ganj including Sindhi, Kashmiris, Pakhtuns, Balochis, Muhajirs and Punjabi Christian.

See also 
 Khasa Hills

References

External links 
 Karachi Website

Neighbourhoods of Karachi
North Nazimabad Town
Karachi Central District